Tomoiku Ara (born 1950 in Tokyo) is a Japanese architect and interior designer. He graduated from the Nihon University Department of Fine Arts.

Chronology 
 1950 – Born in Tokyo
 1973 – Graduated from Nihon University
 1976 – Moved to Italy. Pietro Frenguelli Architects Office.
 1979 – Joined the Superstudio in Florence, studied under Cristiano Toraldo Di Francia
 1981 – Prized at the 16th Triennale di Milano
 1982 – Established Studio Tomo Ara
 1988–1993 – College of Industrial Technology, Nihon University Lecturer in Architectural Engineering
 2002–2007 – Nihon University College of Art Lecturer in Architectural Design Instructor

Representative works 
In 1986, the reconstruction of the Hotel New Hakodate was published in the Italian magazine Ottagono. The project received international recognition.

In 1988, Ara designed the interior of a residential building, VILLA IN A SMALL MOUNTAIN, and in 1992, the interior of a restaurant, CAPRICCIO.

In 2008, Ara completed a large-scale apartment building in Chitose Karasuyama, which he designed in collaboration with architects Cristiano Traldo di Francia and Hiroshi Soeda, under the theme of "Nature in the City".

As a contributor, Ara has successfully organized international events such as TEATRO SUPERSTUDIO (2008) and X-SCAPES Design Exhibition (2009).

As of 2020, architecture and design projects are underway, focusing on regenerative architecture and other forms of "Community Design".

References

Literature 

 "DESIGN PER LA TERRA – STUDIO TOMO ARA ASSOCIATI" 1992
 STUDIO TOMO ARA – Official Website, browsed 27 December 2020

Living people
1950 births
People from Tokyo Metropolis
Nihon University alumni
Japanese interior designers
21st-century Japanese architects
20th-century Japanese architects